Bravo November is the original identification code painted on a British Royal Air Force Boeing Chinook HC6A military serial number ZA718. It was one of the original 30 aircraft ordered by the RAF in 1978 and has been in service ever since. It has been upgraded several times in its history, now being designated as an HC6A airframe. It has seen action in every major operation involving the RAF in the helicopter's 39-year service life. Since 1982 it has served in the Falkland Islands, Lebanon, Germany, Northern Ireland, Iraq and Afghanistan. The aircraft has seen four of its pilots awarded the Distinguished Flying Cross for actions whilst in command of Bravo November.

It first came to the attention of the general public for its survival of the Falklands War. In April 1982 Bravo November was loaded, along with three other Chinooks, aboard the container ship MV Atlantic Conveyor bound for the Falkland Islands on Operation Corporate. Atlantic Conveyor was hit by an Exocet missile, destroying the vessel along with its cargo. It was the only serviceable heavy lift helicopter available to British forces involved in the hostilities. The first of its four Distinguished Flying Crosses came for actions in the Falklands. The aircraft is the subject of an exhibit at the Royal Air Force Museum Cosford.

Construction and callsign
Thirty Chinooks were ordered by the British Government in 1978 at a price of US$200 million. These helicopters were to become British variants of the United States Army's Boeing CH-47 Chinook. ZA718 was one of the final HC1s the RAF received in February 1982. The US army introduced an upgraded Chinook, the CH-47D in the 1980s with improvements including upgraded engines, composite rotor blades, a redesigned cockpit to reduce pilot workload, redundant and improved electrical systems, an advanced flight control system (FCS) and improved avionics. The RAF designation for this new standard of aircraft was the Chinook HC2 with ZA718 becoming the first RAF airframe to be converted in 1993–94. Bravo November has been refitted and upgraded numerous times during its service in the British Armed Forces. There are few parts of the original aircraft that survive today, though the "main fuselage, the manufacturer's data plate in the cockpit and the RAF's serial number ZA718 clearly emblazoned on the rear of the aircraft remain ever present".

The aircraft has had a number of callsigns and designations throughout its career. It had the Boeing construction number of B-849 with the RAF airframe number of ZA718 which is still visible at the rear of the aircraft. The squadron code number of the aircraft has varied with the squadron in which it serves. The most famous code was Bravo November (BN, pronounced as in the NATO phonetic alphabet) which it had during the Falklands War and has been associated with it ever since.

Career
Bravo November has had a distinguished career within the Royal Air Force serving in every conflict of the last 30 years and has seen four of its pilots awarded the Distinguished Flying Cross for actions whilst at the controls of the aircraft.

Falklands War
In April 1982 Bravo November was loaded, along with three other Chinooks, aboard the container ship MV Atlantic Conveyor bound for the Falkland Islands. The Chinooks along with other helicopters and all the second-line repair and maintenance support equipment and stores, were sent to the Falkland Islands to spearhead the British landings there. Prior to departing the UK, the four Chinooks had their rotor blades removed and placed inside them and the aircraft were then placed inside "banana bags", rubberised jackets to protect them. Whilst en route to the Falklands the Chinooks had their rotor blades refitted by technicians of 18 Squadron RAF on board, the first time such a feat had been attempted at sea. On 25 May 1982 the second of two of the Chinooks had just undergone this refitting process when the Atlantic Conveyor was attacked and engulfed in fire by two Argentine Navy Super Étendards that fired two Exocet sea-skimming missiles. It thus avoided the ship's conflagration, and subsequent sinking three days later. Bravo November later landed on the aircraft carrier , gaining the nickname "The Survivor". Owing to the rapid spread of fire and smoke aboard the Atlantic Conveyor after the Exocet strike, it was not possible to fly any of the helicopters that remained on the ship's deck.

The strike on the Atlantic Conveyor had now rendered British forces with only one serviceable heavy lift helicopter, and there were no spares, service manuals, lubricants or tools for it. Even so, it was able to carry some 1,500 troops, 95 casualties, 650 POWs and 550 tons of cargo. The first Distinguished Flying Cross was awarded for actions in the Falklands War. ZA718 was on a night mission when pilot Squadron Leader Dick Langworthy and his co-pilot Flight Lieutenant Andy Lawless, descended after losing visibility in a thick snow shower, hitting the sea at around 100 knots (175 km/h) due to a faulty altimeter. The impact threw up spray that flooded the engine intakes but Langworthy and his co-pilot managed to get the helicopter back in the air. The fuselage was damaged, an antenna had been lost and the co-pilot's door had been torn away. While the co-pilot door was missing, the crew of Bravo November were unable to navigate or communicate with other forces. Bravo November returned to San Carlos for damage inspection. The impact had caused "little more than dents to the fuselage and damage to the radio systems". Sqn Ldr Langworthy was awarded a DFC for his bravery at the controls of ZA718 during the campaign.

Iraq War

Twenty years after the Falklands conflict Bravo November saw service in Iraq, being the first British helicopter to land Royal Marines ashore. The second DFC for actions at the controls of Bravo November was awarded to Squadron Leader Steve Carr for his role in an operation in Iraq. Bravo November was tasked with delivering the Marines to the landing sites marked by US special forces before returning for more troops, guns and freight. The aircraft was being flown at an altitude of less than 100 ft with restricted visibility due to dust clouds thrown up by American armoured forces.

Afghanistan conflict

In June 2006, whilst serving in the Afghanistan conflict, Flight Lieutenant Craig Wilson, Captain of ZA718/BN from 1310 Flt in Helmand Province, received the third Distinguished Flying Cross for 'exceptional courage and outstanding airmanship' while operating in Helmand Province. During the night of 11 June 2006, Flt Lt Craig Wilson was tasked with picking up a casualty. The mission was successful despite the difficult and dangerous conditions that led Wilson to fly the aircraft at the low altitude of 150 ft. A few hours after this incident, the helicopter was called out again on operations, with Wilson landing the helicopter despite being low on fuel. After being on duty for over 22 hours, Wilson volunteered to take reinforcements to the front line, returning with two wounded soldiers. For his actions over the 24‑hour period Flt Lt Wilson was awarded the DFC.

In 2010, Bravo November was involved in another incident while on service in Afghanistan when pilot Flight Lieutenant Ian Fortune was hit by a ricochet from a bullet fired by Taliban fighters during an extraction of injured soldiers. Flt Lt Fortune landed the helicopter in a "hot zone" that was under heavy Taliban fire. After landing, the aircraft was hit numerous times. One round ricocheted and hit Fortune's helmet at the attaching point for the night vision goggles (NVGs) and smashed the visor. He stayed in control of the aircraft and continued to rescue his wounded colleagues and land his damaged helicopter. For his actions he was awarded the fourth Distinguished Flying Cross in the history of the aircraft.
	
Bravo November returned from Afghanistan in 2010.

The helicopter was retired from service in March 2022, as part of a project to replace the RAF's nine oldest Chinooks with more modern CH-47F variants. After leaving service the helicopter was prepared for display at the RAF Museum Cosford.

Legacy

At the RAF Museum in London there is a forward fuselage of a former United States Army Chinook painted to represent "Bravo November – the RAF's Most Famous Chinook". The museum's fine art collection also houses a painting by Joe Naujokas, depicting two of the DFCs obtained by Bravo Novembers crewmembers. The painting was presented to the Royal Air Force Museum by Sir Michael Jenkins, president of Boeing UK, on 9 December 2004.

In April 2022 the aircraft was transported to RAF Museum Cosford, and is now on display to the public in the Museum's new Falklands War display.

References

Notes

Bibliography

Royal Air Force
Individual aircraft